Percy C. Thomas Watson (March 1869 – 1949) was an English professional footballer who played in the Football League for Rotherham Town and Small Heath. Born in Barnsley, which was then in the West Riding of Yorkshire, Watson played in the Second Division for both Rotherham Town and Small Heath during the 1893–94 season.

References

1869 births
1949 deaths
Footballers from Barnsley
English footballers
Association football fullbacks
Rotherham Town F.C. (1878) players
Birmingham City F.C. players
English Football League players
Date of death missing
Place of death missing